NFL Dream Season is a TV show on ESPN in 1989 in which 20 all-time great NFL teams were pitted against each other using XOR Software's NFL Challenge, a computer football simulation program. NFL Films footage was used to create what appeared to be a "game" between the two teams.  The 1978 Steelers beat the 1972 Dolphins to win the title. The following year, ESPN did a one-off show with the 1989 Super Bowl Champion 49ers against the '78 Steelers.  In 1999, ESPN would run a similar mini-series, having overall "decade" teams of the 60s Packers, 70s Steelers, 80s 49ers, and 90s Cowboys playing each other.

Final standings and playoff results

East
1978 Steelers 6-0
1986 Giants 4-2
1959 Colts 3-3
1960 Eagles 2-4
1968 Jets 1-5

West
1984 49ers 6-0
1977 Cowboys 3-3
1983 Raiders 1-5
1963 Chargers 1-5
1951 Rams 1-5

North
1976 Raiders 6-0
1985 Bears 5-1
1966 Packers 4-2
1953 Lions 2-4
1964 Browns 1-5

South
1972 Dolphins 6-0
1982 Redskins 3-3
1955 Browns 3-3
1969 Chiefs 2-4
1971 Cowboys 0-6

Semis
1978 Steelers over 84 49ers (21-20)
1972 Dolphins over 76 Raiders (24-21)

Dream Bowl
1978 Steelers over 1972 Dolphins (21-20)

References

External links 
 Article about NFL Dream Season
 Google Groups discussion with attributed results

ESPN original programming
NFL Films
1989 American television series debuts
1990 American television series endings